Renaud of Vendôme was one of the first chancellors of France. He was bishop of Paris from 991 to 1017 as well as count of Vendôme (1005–1017). He was from the Bouchardides family, as a son of Bouchard I the Venerable and of Elisabeth of Melun.

Chancellor to Hugh Capet (988), who later made him bishop of Paris, Renaud's power was reduced by the accession of Robert II le Pieux (996) and his influence on the royal council diminished. He stayed in the Vendômois more and more, and succeeded his father as count in 1005.

Sources
 Dominique Barthélemy, La Société dans le comté de Vendôme : de l'an mil au XIVe siècle, 1993
 Jean-Claude Pasquier, Le Château de Vendôme, 2000
 les comtes de Vendôme

10th-century French bishops
11th-century French Roman Catholic bishops
Bishops of Paris
Counts of Vendôme
1017 deaths
Year of birth unknown